Anthelia is a genus of soft corals in the family Xeniidae.

Species
The World Register of Marine Species lists the following species:

Anthelia elongata  Roxas, 1933 
Anthelia fallax Broch, 1912 
Anthelia fishelsoni Verseveldt, 1969 
Anthelia glauca Lamarck, 1816 
Anthelia gracilis (May, 1898) 
Anthelia hicksoni Gohar, 1940 
Anthelia japonica Kükenthal, 1906 
Anthelia mahenensis Janes, 2008 
Anthelia rosea Hickson, 1930 
Anthelia simplex Thomson & Dean, 1931 
Anthelia strumosa Ehrenberg, 1834 
Anthelia ternatana (Schenk, 1896) 
Anthelia tosana Utinomi, 1958

References

Xeniidae
Octocorallia genera